The Sośnica-Makoszowy coal mine is a large mine in the south of Poland near Gliwice and Zabrze, Silesian Voivodeship, 267 km south-west of the capital, Warsaw. Sośnica-Makoszowy represents one of the largest coal reserves in Poland, having estimated reserves of 180 million tonnes of coal. The annual coal production is around 4.27 million tonnes.

References

External links 
 Official site

Coal mines in Poland
Buildings and structures in Gliwice
Buildings and structures in Zabrze
Coal mines in Silesian Voivodeship